The Men's 10,000 metres at the 2009 World Championships in Athletics was held at the Olympic Stadium on 17 August. A large field of 31 athletes from 15 countries was set to participate in the final, although Irishman Martin Fagan did not start the competition.

Kenenisa Bekele was the favourite before the race, having never lost a race over the distance and starting the race as the reigning Olympic and World champion, as well as the world record holder. Four-time major championship silver medallist Sileshi Sihine was another strong competitor, but he withdrew due to an injury and was replaced by Ethiopian team's reserve Imane Merga. Gebregziabher Gebremariam and Kenyans Moses Masai and Micah Kogo were other possible medallists, as well as the consistent Eritrean, Zersenay Tadese.

Tadese sprinted to lead the race at the start but he was soon overtaken by Nicholas Kemboi, who led until the 4000-metre mark. Tadese and Masai picked up the pace and the Eritrean fronted the fastest group of runners from 5000 metres onwards. After a kilometre further on, a group of four runners (Tadese, Masai, Bekele and Kogo) were clearly leading the race as the other competitors trailed off. Tadese continued to lead and picked up the pace once again, at which point Kogo dropped off, shortly followed by Masai. Bekele continued to follow Tadese waiting, and on the last lap the reigning champion finally took the lead, sprinting away to win the gold medal in a Championship record time of 26:46.31. Tadese took the silver, with a run of 26:50.12, and Masai maintained his third position for the bronze.

Ever the strongest performer, Bekele remained undefeated to win his fourth consecutive 10,000 m at the World Championships, but it was second-placed Tadese's first medal at the World Championships. Moses Masai's bronze was his family's second of the competition, as his sister Linet Masai had won the Women's 10,000 metres two days earlier.

Medalists

Records

Prior to the competition, the following world and championship records were as follows.

The following new Championship record was set during this competition.

Qualification standards

Schedule

Final

Key:  CR = Championship record, DNF = Did not finish, DNS = Did not start, PB = Personal best, SB = Seasonal best

Splits

References

External links
10,000 metres startlist from IAAF. IAAF. Retrieved on 2009-08-16.

10,000 metres
10,000 metres at the World Athletics Championships